Margot Ciccarelli (born 17 November 1993) is a Brazilian jiu-jitsu competitor and coach.

Representing Italy, she is a multiple-time World, World Pro, World No-Gi and European Open Champion in the lower belt divisions. Ciccarelli is a two-time World Championship medalist, a two-time Pan American Championship medalist and a European Championship black belt medalist.

Early life 
Ciccarelli was born on 17 November 1993 in London, the daughter of an Italian father and a Chinese mother. Raised in the UK, Ciccarelli learned Wushu from the age of 6 before progressing to Chinese kickboxing and Wing Chun Kung Fu. She took her first jiu-jitsu class just before her 19th birthday.

Career 
Ciccarelli trained in various academies around the world during her coloured belt years. She was promoted to blue belt in Hong Kong (under Atos) and purple belt in London (under Inglorious Grapplers). In May 2017, she joined New York based team Unity Jiu Jitsu and started training under Murilo Santana.

As a purple belt, she won the World Championship twice, the European Championship twice, the Asian Open Championship three times and the Abu Dhabi World Professional Championship twice. After receiving her brown belt from Santana in 2019, she won the World No-Gi Championship, the European Championship, the Pan No-Gi Championship and the 2020 American National Championship in both Gi and No-Gi.

Ciccarelli was promoted to black belt in May 2021 by Murilo Santana. In her first six months at black belt, she won silver at the Abu Dhabi World Professional Championship, silver at the Pan American Championship and bronze at the World Championship losing to Beatriz Mesquita in the semi-final by referee's decision (0x0 pts). Ciccarelli won bronze at the 2022 European Championship taking place in Rome, then bronze at the 2022 World Jiu-Jitsu Championship after losing by points in the semi-final against Ffion Davies. In October 2022, she moved to California to train under Guilherme Mendes at the Art of Jiu Jitsu.

Style 
While training jiu-jitsu, Ciccarelli also practised a variety of movement-based activities such as contemporary dance, hip hop dance and circus skills including flying trapeze and aerial straps. According to Ciccarelli, her aim is "to win with beautiful, superior movement quality and not just win for winning's sake."

Personal life 
Ciccarelli identifies as pansexual. In December 2022, she married her partner, Meg He, an e-commerce entrepreneur and co-founder of Aday, a sustainable clothing brand.

Brazilian jiu-jitsu competitive summary 
Main Achievements (at black belt level):
 2nd place at Pan American Championship (2021)
 2nd place at Abu Dhabi World Professional Championship (2021)
 3rd place at World Championship (2021 / 2022)
 3rd place at Pan American Championship (2022)

Main Achievements (at coloured belt level):
 2x World Champion (2018, 2019 purple belt)
 World No-Gi Champion (2019 brown belt)
 2x Abu Dhabi World Professional Champion (2018, 2019 purple belt)
 3x European Champion (2017, 2018 purple belt, 2020 brown belt)
 Pan No-Gi Champion (2021 brown belt)
 American National Champion (2020 brown belt)
 American National No-Gi Champion (2020 brown belt)
 3x Asian Champion (2016, 2017, 2018 purple belt)
 Pan Pacific Champion (2016 purple belt)

Instructor lineage 
Rickson Gracie → Marcelo Behring → Mario Yamasaki → Murilo Santana → Margot Ciccarelli

Notes

References 

Living people
1993 births
People awarded a black belt in Brazilian jiu-jitsu
World Brazilian Jiu-Jitsu Championship medalists
Female Brazilian jiu-jitsu practitioners
LGBT Brazilian jiu-jitsu practitioners
Sportspeople from London